Appian Graphics was a supplier of multi-monitor graphics accelerators founded in 1994.

History
The company was best known for its Jeronimo and Gemini product lines, and for the HydraVision display management software. The main competitor for Appian on the multi-monitor solutions market was STB Systems.

The company was acquired in July 2001 by Colorgraphic Communications, Inc., which ceased business in 2007 or 2008.

Appian Graphics originally developed HydraVision in the late 1990s for their multi-head display solutions. ATI Technologies acquired HydraVision in July 2001 along with Appian's HydraVision team to join its then-new dual-head Radeon 7500 and 8500 series.

Graphics adapters 

 Appian Graphics Jeronimo J2/N
 Dual Head 3/4 size PCI adapter
 4 MB
 Cirrus Logic CL-GDGD5462-HC-B chipset
 Appian Jeronimo Pro
 Dual Head PCI adapter
 8 or 16MB (4 or 8MB/head)
 3Dlabs Permedia 2 VPU chipset
 Appian Jeronimo Pro 4-Port
 Quad Head PCI adapter
 32MB (8MB/head)
 3Dlabs Permedia 2 VPU chipset
 Appian Jeronimo 2000
 DualHead PCI adapter
 64MB (32MB/head)
 3Dlabs Permedia 3 VPU chipset
 Appian Gemini
 Dual Head AGP 2X adapter
 16MB SGRAM
 S3 Savage MX chipset based
Appian Rushmore
Quad Head PCI adapter
64MB (32MB/head)
Dual ATI R100 chipset based

References

External links

 
 
 

ATI Technologies
American companies established in 1994
American companies disestablished in 2001
Canadian companies established in 1994
Canadian companies disestablished in 2001
Computer companies established in 1994
Computer companies disestablished in 2001
Computer companies of Canada
Defunct computer companies of the United States
Graphics hardware companies